Amber Dawn Coffman (born June 15, 1984) is an American musician, singer and songwriter based in Los Angeles, California, formerly based in Brooklyn, New York. A former member of Sleeping People, Coffman is best known as a former guitarist and vocalist for the indie rock band Dirty Projectors. She released her debut solo album, City of No Reply, on June 2, 2017.

Early life 
Coffman grew up in Ohio, Texas, and California and attended 11 different schools. She had an early love of the women in R&B in the 1990s, and became interested in rock as a teenager.

Music career
As a teenager living in San Diego, Coffman worked at a grocery store as a day job and was a guitarist in an instrumental math rock band called Sleeping People.

Dirty Projectors 
Coffman moved to New York at 22 and joined Dirty Projectors on guitar and vocals, beginning with the band's 2006 tour for Rise Above. She continued with the band through Bitte Orca (2009), the Björk collaboration Mount Wittenberg Orca (2010, inspired by Coffman sighting a family of Orcas off the coast of California), Swing Lo Magellan (2012) and the EP About to Die (2012).

Dee Lockett, in New York Magazine, said Coffman's "soft, silky voice stood out on the band’s biggest songs, like 'Stillness Is the Move'" from Bitte Orca. Describing Coffman's influence on the band's sound, Erik Adams wrote in the A.V. Club: Amber Coffman made the avant-garde almost mistakable for Top 40. Coffman’s melismatic lead on "Stillness Is The Move" was a breakout moment for the Brooklyn band, and in harmony with Angel Deradoorian and Haley Dekle, she formed a vocal powerhouse that could either provide a radio-friendly counterpoint to David Longstreth's Arthur Russell-esque bleats or urge songs like "Useful Chamber" and "Gun Has No Trigger" deeper into alien territory.

Solo work 

While in the band, Coffman also continued to create her own demos. She began writing an album in 2011 and released City of No Reply, her first solo album, on June 2, 2017.

Other collaborations 
Coffman has also collaborated with electronic artist Rusko on the 2010 track "Hold On" and with Diplo of Major Lazer on the 2012 track "Get Free". In 2013, she was featured on hip hop artist J. Cole's song "She Knows" from his album Born Sinner. In 2012, she collaborated on "No Regrets" with Snoop Lion and T.I.
She also collaborated with rapper Riff Raff on a song called "Cool It Down" on his Neon Icon album. She sang on Frank Ocean's song "Nikes", the lead single from his album Blonde.

Discography

Sleeping People
Growing (2007)

Dirty Projectors
Rise Above (2007)
Bitte Orca (2009)
Mount Wittenberg Orca featuring Björk (2010)
Swing Lo Magellan (2012)
About to Die EP (2012)

Solo

Album
City of No Reply (2017)

Singles
 "All to Myself" (2016)
 "No Coffee" (2017)
 "Nobody Knows" (2017)

As featured artist

References

External links

Diplo talks about collaboration with Amber Coffman and Major Lazer on MTV.com
Stereogum's preview of "Get Free" with Major Lazer
Pitchfork review of "Stillness is the Move"
San Diego Reader on Sleeping People

1984 births
Living people
Musicians from Austin, Texas
21st-century American singers
Dirty Projectors members